Eric Holmes may refer to:

 Eric Holmes (racing driver) (born 1974), American race car driver
 Eric Holmes (video game designer), Scottish writer, creative director and videogame designer
 Eric Leighton Holmes, British chemist